Wth or WTH may be:
 a rare abbreviation for Watt-hour
 the ISO 639-3 code of the Wathawurrung language
 an internet slang abbreviation for "What the hell" or "what the heck"
 the Amtrak station code for Winter Haven station, Florida, United States
 the National Rail station code for Whitehaven railway station, Cumbria, England
 an abbreviation for whole-tree harvest, a forestry practice similar to whole-tree logging